Pterostylis silvicultrix, commonly known as the Chatham Island greenhood or tutukiwi, is a species of orchid which is endemic to Chatham Island and nearby islands. Non-flowering plants have a rosette of leaves but flowering plants have leaves on the flowering stem, some of which reach above the single translucent white flower with dark green stripes. It is similar to Pterostylis banksii which occurs on both of the main islands of New Zealand but that species lacks the orange or reddish-brown tips on the flowers of this species.

Description
Pterostylis silvicultrix is a terrestrial, perennial, deciduous, herb with an underground tuber and which often grows in colonies. The dorsal sepal and petals are fused, forming a hood or "galea" over the column. The lateral sepals are erect, there is a wide gap between them and the galea and they are joined at the base to close off part of the front of the flower. The lateral sepals taper suddenly to narrow tips  and there is a broad, sloping, V-shaped sinus between them. The labellum is erect and green and protrudes through the sinus. Flowering occurs in November and December.

Taxonomy and naming
This greenhood was first formally described in 1864 by Ferdinand von Mueller who gave it the name Pterostylis banksii var. silvicultrix and published the description in The Vegetation of the Chatham-Islands. In 2002, Brian Molloy, David Jones and Mark Clements raised the variety to species status.

Distribution and habitat
Pterostylis silvicultrix is widespread in forests, near streams, bogs and wetland margins, often growing on the trunks of tree ferns. It is found on Chatham, Pitt, Mangere and South East Islands.

References

silvicultrix
Orchids of New Zealand
Flora of the Chatham Islands
Plants described in 1864